The East Indies campaign may refer to:

 The First Carnatic War
 The Second Carnatic War
 The Third Carnatic War
 The East Indies Campaign of the Anglo-French War (1778–1783)
 The East Indies theatre of the French Revolutionary Wars

See also
 West Indies Campaign (disambiguation)
 War of the League of the Indies
 Indian War (disambiguation)